The men's double sculls competition at the 1972 Summer Olympics in Munich took place from 27 August – 2 September at the Olympic Reggatta Course in Oberschleißheim.

Results

Heats
Winner of each heat (green) qualify to the semifinal round, remainder goes to the repechage.

Heat 1

Heat 2

Heat 3

Heat 4

Repechage
Top two finishers in each heat qualify to the semifinal round.

Repechage 1

Repechage 2

Repechage 3

Repechage 4

Semifinals

Semifinal A/B
First three qualify to the Final A, remainder to Final B.

Semifinal 1

Semifinal 2

Finals

Final B

Final A

References

External links
  Official reports of the 1972 Summer Olympics

Men's double sculls